The Tony Award for Best Original Score is the Tony Award given to the composers and lyricists of the best original score written for a musical or play in that year. The score consists of music and/or lyrics. To be eligible, a score must be written specifically for the theatre and must be original; compilations of non-theatrical music or compilations of earlier theatrical music are not eligible for consideration.

History
The award has undergone a number of minor changes. In 1947, 1950, 1951, and 1962, the award went to the composer only. Otherwise, the award has gone to the composer and lyricist for their combined contributions, except for 1971 when the two awards were split (although Stephen Sondheim won both, for Company).

In only nine years have non-musical plays been nominated for Tony Awards in this category: Much Ado About Nothing in 1973, The Good Doctor in 1974, The Song of Jacob Zulu in 1993, Twelfth Night in 1999, Enron and Fences in 2010, Peter and the Starcatcher and One Man, Two Guvnors in 2012, Angels in America in 2018, To Kill a Mockingbird in 2019, and A Christmas Carol, The Inheritance, The Rose Tattoo, Slave Play, and The Sound Inside in 2020.  Because the Broadway season of 2019-2020 was shortened due to the COVID-19 pandemic, only four musicals were eligible for Tony Awards.  Three were jukebox musicals and the fourth was The Lightning Thief, the only musical of the season with original music.  The Lightning Thief was not nominated for any Tony Awards, meaning that every nominee in this category in 2020 was a play rather than a musical.

In 2013, Cyndi Lauper became the first woman to win the award solo for Kinky Boots.  In 2005, Lisa Kron and Jeanine Tesori became the first all-woman team to win the award for Fun Home.

Toby Marlow is the youngest person to win the award; he was 27 when he won in tandem with Lucy Moss for SIX. Adolph Green is the oldest person to win the award; he was 76 when he won for The Will Rogers Follies. If T. S. Eliot were alive when he won for Cats, he would have been 94. Eliot is one of two people to receive the award posthumously, the other being Jonathan Larson, who won for Rent. He would have been 36.

Winners and nominees

1940s

1950s

1960s

1970s

1980s

1990s

2000s

2010s

2020s

Award records

Multiple wins

 6 Wins
 Stephen Sondheim (3 consecutive)

 3 Wins
 Cy Coleman (2 consecutive)
 Betty Comden
 Fred Ebb
 Adolph Green
 John Kander
 Andrew Lloyd Webber

 2 Wins
 Jerry Herman
 Robert Lopez
 Lin-Manuel Miranda
 Tim Rice
 Richard Rodgers
 Maury Yeston
 Jason Robert Brown

Multiple nominations

 11 Nominations
 Fred Ebb
 John Kander
 Andrew Lloyd Webber

 10 Nominations
 Stephen Sondheim

 9 Nominations
 Cy Coleman

 7 Nominations
 Tim Rice

 5 Nominations
 Don Black
 Jerry Herman
 Richard Maltby Jr.
 Alan Menken
 Stephen Schwartz
 Jeanine Tesori
 David Yazbek

 4 Nominations
 Jason Robert Brown
 Betty Comden
 Adolph Green
 Sheldon Harnick
 Richard Rodgers
 Charles Strouse

 3 Nominations
 Howard Ashman
 Chad Beguelin
 Jerry Bock
 Elton John
 Tom Kitt
 Alan Jay Lerner
 Robert Lopez
 Glenn Slater
 Maury Yeston

 2 Nominations
 Lynn Ahrens
 Sara Bareilles
 Nell Benjamin
 Elmer Bernstein
 Susan Birkenhead
 Alain Boublil
 Leslie Bricusse
 Craig Carnelia
 Joe Darion
 Dorothy Fields
 William Finn
 Stephen Flaherty
 Micki Grant
 Amanda Green
 Larry Grossman
 Adam Guettel
 Marvin Hamlisch
 Charles Hart
 Joel Hirschhorn
 Tom Jones
 Al Kasha
 Edward Kleban
 Michael Korie
 Henry Krieger
 Michael John LaChiusa
 Burton Lane
 Cyndi Lauper
 Carolyn Leigh
 Peter Link
 Hugh Martin
 Tim Minchin
 Lin-Manuel Miranda
 Anthony Newley
 Benj Pasek
 Justin Paul
 Harvey Schmidt
 Claude-Michel Schönberg
 David Shire
 Matthew Sklar
 Michael Stewart
 Richard Stilgoe
 Jule Styne
 Kurt Weill
 Frank Wildhorn
 Brian Yorkey
 David Zippel

Female winners
Only eight women have won this award, five of whom won without male writing partners, and for only nine shows:

 Betty Comden – Hallelujah, Baby! (1968), On the Twentieth Century (1978), and The Will Rogers Follies (1991), becoming the first and, so far, only woman to win this Tony multiple times.
 Lynn Ahrens – Ragtime (1998)
 Lisa Lambert – The Drowsy Chaperone (2006)
 Cyndi Lauper – Kinky Boots (2013), becoming the first woman to win this Tony without a male writing partner.
 Jeanine Tesori and Lisa Kron – Fun Home (2015), becoming the first all-female songwriting team (music and lyrics) to win this Tony.
 Anaïs Mitchell — Hadestown (2019)
 Lucy Moss -  Six (2022)

References

External links
Official Tony Awards website
Internet Broadway Database Awards

Tony Awards
Awards established in 1947
Songwriting awards
1947 establishments in the United States